The Shaw Prize is an annual award presented by the Shaw Prize Foundation. Established in 2002 in Hong Kong, it honours "individuals who are currently active in their respective fields and who have recently achieved distinguished and significant advances, who have made outstanding contributions in academic and scientific research or applications, or who in other domains have achieved excellence. The award is dedicated to furthering societal progress, enhancing quality of life, and enriching humanity's spiritual civilization."

The prize has been described as the "Nobel of the East". It was founded by Hong Kong entertainment mogul and philanthropist Run Run Shaw (邵逸夫).

Award 
The prize consists of three awards in the fields of astronomy, life science and medicine, and mathematical sciences; it is not awarded posthumously. Nominations are submitted by invited individuals beginning each year in September. Winners are announced in the summer and receive the award at a ceremony in early autumn. Each award consists of a gold medal, a certificate and USD$1.2 million (USD$1 million before 2015). The front of the medal bears a portrait of Shaw and the name of the prize in English and Traditional Chinese characters; the back bears the year, category, laureate's name and a quotation from the Chinese philosopher Xunzi "制天命而用之" (translated to English as "Grasp the law of nature and make use of it").

As of 2022, there have been 99 Shaw Laureates. 16 Nobel laureates - Jules A. Hoffmann, Bruce Beutler, Saul Perlmutter, Adam Riess, Shinya Yamanaka, Robert Lefkowitz , Brian Schmidt, Jeffrey C. Hall, Michael Rosbash, Michael W. Young, Kip Thorne, Rainer Weiss, Jim Peebles, Michel Mayor, Reinhard Genzel, and David Julius - are Shaw Laureates. The inaugural laureate of the Shaw Prize in Astronomy was Jim Peebles, honored for his contributions to cosmology. Two inaugural prizes were awarded for the Shaw Prize in Life Science and Medicine: Stanley Norman Cohen, Herbert Boyer and Yuet Wai Kan jointly won one of them for their research in DNA while physiologist Richard Doll won the other for his contribution to cancer epidemiology. Shiing-Shen Chern was awarded the inaugural Shaw Prize in Mathematical Sciences for his work on differential geometry.

Shaw Laureates

Astronomy

Life science and medicine

Mathematical sciences

Notes 
 The form and spelling of the names according to the Shaw Prize Foundation.
 Sites of the work places of the Laureates at the time of the award.
 The rationale from the Shaw Prize Foundation.
 Two prizes were awarded for the life science and medicine category in 2004: Stanley N. Cohen, Herbert W. Boyer and Yuet-Wai Kan jointly received one of the prizes (half went to Cohen and Boyer; the other half went to Kan). Richard Doll received the other prize.
 Half of the 2008 life science and medicine prize went to Keith H. S. Campbell and Ian Wilmut; the other half went to Shinya Yamanaka.

See also 
 List of general science and technology awards 
 List of astronomy awards
 List of mathematics awards
 List of medicine awards
 List of physics awards

References

Academic awards
Mathematics awards
Medicine awards
Physics awards
Astronomy prizes
Science and technology awards
Awards established in 2002
International awards
Hong Kong awards
2002 establishments in Hong Kong